The Eskalators are an American Brooklyn-based steampunk and vegan musical collective, puppeteering ensemble, and experimental street mime troupe, formed by Eric Williams in the summer of 2007. The group is known for holding elaborate, public performances, fire poi artistry, and flash mobs on New York City Subway cars without formal written consent from the subway's operator, the MTA.

Founding
Eric Williams was driving cross-country with the members of The Best Thing Ever to film a documentary about them. During the middle of the trip, he decided to start his own band to open shows for The Best Thing Ever, and was soon joined by Alec Billig and Jennifer Page of The Best Thing Ever. They played their first show on an escalator at the Mall of America.

The Eskalators released their first recording, Never Break Down, in April 2008. Shortly after, New York City promoter Joe Ahearn approached the band about performing on a subway car before one of his upcoming shows. The Eskalators agreed, and have continued to play subway shows, each centered on a different Subway station and train line.

Members
Active members include:
 Vocals, Fire Poi – Eric Williams
 Violin – Wen-Jay Ying
 Flute – Amanda Rodi
 Flute – Marie Miller
 Melodica – Sanji Moore
 Glockenspiel – Guia Adiao
 Electric guitar – Peter Naddeo
 Air guitar – Mark Storella
 Clarinet – Ahuro Nina
 Bass guitar – Dan Byer
 Djembe – Davide Pivi
 Keyboard – Melissa "Bostian" Frost
 Saxophone – Janelle Jones
 Trumpet – Alec Billig
 Drums – Chris Parker
 Musical Saw – Annmarie Nye, Nina Hazen
 Accordion – Ben Morse
 Washboard – Matt Bennett

Discography
EPs

References

External links
Eskalators Official Band Website
Subway Show No. 4 Documentary by Flipswitch Films
Eskalators at 2008 Todd P Acoustic BBQ on Roosevelt Island

Punk rock groups from New York (state)
Indie rock musical groups from New York (state)
Musical collectives
Musical groups from Brooklyn
Musical groups established in 2007